This is a Chinese name; the family name is Su.

Cong Su (born 1957 in Tianjin, China) is a Chinese composer.

He studied at the Central Conservatory of Music in Beijing, then in Germany. He has lectured on music theory, music analysis, film music and ballet music at the Musikhochschule in Munich. Since 1991 he is professor of film and media composition at the newly founded State Film Academy in the Stuttgart area.

Together with Ryuichi Sakamoto and David Byrne, Su won the Best Original Score Academy Award for the Bernardo Bertolucci film The Last Emperor in 1987; the soundtrack album won the Best Score Soundtrack for Visual Media award at the 31st Annual Grammy Awards in 1989.

Su has also scored other film soundtracks, mostly for Asian films. He divides his time between Beijing, Lake Constance, and Lucca, Italy.

Works

Film 
 The Last Emperor – Soundtrack (1987)
 Green Tea (2002)
 Jasmine Women (2004)

References

External links 

1957 births
Living people
20th-century classical composers
21st-century classical composers
People's Republic of China composers
Chinese male classical composers
Chinese classical composers
Chinese film score composers
Grammy Award winners
Golden Globe Award-winning musicians
Best Original Music Score Academy Award winners
Musicians from Tianjin
Male film score composers
20th-century male musicians
21st-century male musicians